Shcherbaki is a rural locality (a khutor) in Poboishchensky Selsoviet, Kugarchinsky District, Bashkortostan, Russia. The population was 18 as of 2010. There is 1 street.

Geography 
Shcherbaki is located 47 km east of Mrakovo (the district's administrative centre) by road. Poboishche is the nearest rural locality.

References 

Rural localities in Kugarchinsky District